For the Ukrainian footballer, see Yevhen Pavlov

Evgeny Nikolaevich Pavlov (born 10 January 1981) is a Russian former professional ice hockey player. He was drafted 121st overall by the Nashville Predators in the 1999 NHL Entry Draft.

External links

1981 births
Living people
Cincinnati Cyclones (ECHL) players
HC CSK VVS Samara players
HC Lada Togliatti players
HC Neftekhimik Nizhnekamsk players
HC Sibir Novosibirsk players
HC Spartak Moscow players
Milwaukee Admirals players
Nashville Predators draft picks
Russian ice hockey forwards
Sportspeople from Tolyatti